Dereiçi is a village in Mardin Province in southeastern Turkey. It is located by Mount Qoros in the district of Savur and the historical region of Tur Abdin. It is populated by Assyrians who speak the Mardin dialect of Arabic.

In the village, there is a church of Mor Yuhannon. The ruins of the monasteries of Mor Abay, Mor Theodotus, and Mor Dimet are also located near the village.

History
The church of Mor Yuhannon was likely constructed in the late 7th century. Qeleth was part of the Syriac Orthodox diocese of the Monastery of Mor Abay until the death of its last bishop Isḥoq Ṣaliba in 1730, upon which the diocese was subsumed into the diocese of Mardin.

Qeleth was attacked by Kurds in early November 1895 during the Hamidian massacres. In 1900, the village was inhabited by Syriac Orthodox, Syriac Catholic, and Syriac Protestant Christians. Amidst the Sayfo, Qeleth was attacked by Kurds from Rajdiye, Mıtajniye, and Deraveriye. Some villagers with guns were able to defend their homes however most were killed, including the pastor Hannuş İbrahim, the women and children were abducted, and over 200 homes were completely devastated.

Qeleth had a population of 871 people in 1960, including 600 Syriac Orthodox Assyrians. The village was largely abandoned as its inhabitants emigrated abroad in the 1970s, and by 2018 only a few families continue to reside at Qeleth. Villagers historically emigrated to Latin America but have more recently emigrated to Germany and Sweden. In 1974, 20 Syriac Protestant families inhabited Qeleth. By 2013, 14-15 Assyrians in 5-6 families populated the village.

References
Notes

Citations

Bibliography

 

Villages in Savur District
Tur Abdin
Assyrian communities in Turkey
Places of the Assyrian genocide